Yusefabad (also Romanized as Yūsefābād) is a village in Takht-e Jolgeh Rural District, in the Central District of Firuzeh County, Razavi Khorasan Province, Iran. At the 2006 census, its population was 408, in 105 families.

References 

Populated places in Firuzeh County